Violetta is the soundtrack album to the eponymous series.

Background

Production 
The album was recorded during the filming of the first season of the television series. The lead single "En mi mundo" was released on April 5, 2012 with their official video, and subsequently published other singles from the album.

Released 
Released in Latin America on June 5, 2012, in Italy on October 12, 2012 with 16 tracks, two more than the original with the re-release of the songs "En mi mundo" and "Te creo" in Italian, the second sung by actress Lodovica Comello. In Spain, was released on November 20, 2012.

To promote the album in Italy the actor Ruggero Pasquarelli met with fans at Mondadori in Milan on October 27, 2012.

Certifications 
The album received quadruple platinum in Argentina for selling more than 180,000 copies and platinum in Spain. It's also become certified gold in Colombia and Chile, and platinum in Uruguay and Venezuela. Junto a ti is featured in the rhythm video game Just Dance 2016. In Mexico and Brazil, the album has sold more than 20,000 copies.

Track listing

Latin American edition

Italy edition

Brazil edition

Charts

Weekly charts

Year-end charts

Certifications

|-
!scope="row"|Chile (CHI)
| Gold 
| 5,000^
|-

Awards and nominations

References 

2012 soundtrack albums
Violetta (TV series)
Television soundtracks